Mary Norwood (born 1952) is an American businesswoman and politician who is a  member of the Atlanta City Council.  She was a candidate for mayor of Atlanta in 2009 and 2017.  In both campaigns she advanced to the runoff, but respectively lost to Kasim Reed and Keisha Lance Bottoms by narrow margins.  In addition to her mayoral runs, she represented city-wide posts on the Atlanta City Council from 2002 to 2010 and again from 2014 to 2018.    She resides in the Tuxedo Park neighborhood of Atlanta's Buckhead community.

2009 Atlanta mayoral election

Mary Norwood has been involved in the Atlanta area for the past 30 years, beginning as a community activist. In 2009, she ran for Mayor of the City of Atlanta, but eventually lost to Kasim Reed in a runoff election.

Norwood received 46 percent of the vote on Election Day, the largest proportion of all the candidates, but as no candidate received a majority (more than 50% of the vote), she entered a runoff election on December 1, 2009. However, Kasim Reed received more votes in the runoff, and, after a recount, Norwood conceded.

According to an investigation by the staff of the Atlanta Journal-Constitution, campaign records show that the Georgia Democratic Party spent at least $165,000 to attack Norwood. This, along with an eight percent jump in voters for the runoff contributed to Reed winning the mayoral runoff election by about 700 votes out of approximately 84,000 votes total.

Norwood campaigned on a platform of fiscal responsibility, and in a political advertisement she asserted that the city of Atlanta had misplaced $100 million.  However, the city administration disputed the claim, explaining that $116 million was borrowed from the Watershed Management Department for city projects, and the money is being repaid by those departments.

Taxes 
Norwood voted against the tax increase proposal in June 2008, which did not pass. The City of Atlanta then responded by reducing public safety personnel and imposed a 10 percent pay cut on city workers to balance the budget. In both instances, Norwood asked the City to reduce its spending on areas other than public safety personnel.

The City of Atlanta’s budget was said to be balanced for several years.  However, by March 2009, Atlanta’s bond rating was downgraded by Standard & Poor’s, a key credit rating agency. This downgrade resulted from four years of operating deficits, as well as longer-term pressures associated with the Atlanta’s underfunded pensions, police overtime, and subsidies to several funds.  Atlanta’s solid waste and capital finance funds were also downgraded.

In June 2009, the City Council voted 8-7, to increase the Atlanta property tax rate for general operations from 7.12 mills to 10.12 mills, a 42 percent increase.  Atlanta is one of the few big cities nationwide to raise property taxes that year. Mary Norwood voted against this increase, insisting that there was money to be found within Atlanta’s budget.

2017 Atlanta mayoral election
Norwood filed to run in the 2017 Atlanta mayoral election in October 2016. Similar to the 2009 race, she has called for increased transparency in the municipal government, along with various additions to Atlanta's public transportation systems.  According to the Norwood campaign website, her campaign is focused broadly on four issues: safety, transparency, sustainability, and prosperity.  Norwood was initially considered the frontrunner in the race due to her strong performance in the 2009 runoff and her history of being elected city-wide.

The race attracted significant attention due to Norwood's status as an independent politician and the fact that, if elected, she would have been the first white mayor of Atlanta since Sam Massell in 1974.  Several of Norwood's opponents and the Georgia Democratic Party attempted to portray her as a Republican.

In the first round of voting held November 7, Norwood came in second place with 20,144 votes.  She advanced to a runoff with city councilor Keisha Lance Bottoms, who was endorsed by mayor Kasim Reed.  Norwood and Bottoms participated in multiple debates and forums during the runoff campaign, and Norwood was endorsed by former candidates Cathy Woolard and Ceasar Mitchell and former Mayor Shirley Franklin.  During the runoff campaign, Bottoms made an issue of Norwood's use of the word "thug" in comments she made before a Young Republicans meeting in 2009.

Norwood lost to Keisha Lance Bottoms by 759 votes in the runoff on December 5. As in 2009, Norwood initially asked for a recount and refused to concede on election night.  A recount later took place on December 14, but failed to give Norwood the edge. She eventually decided to not further contest the election results and conceded the race on December 21.

Support for 2020 Election Lawsuit
Norwood signed an affidavit, notarized on November 29, 2020, that was included "in a lawsuit intended to invalidate Georgia's 16 electoral college votes" for then President-Elect Joe Biden.

Education 
Mary Norwood attended Sweet Briar College, is a graduate of Emory University, and has been an Atlanta resident for 35 years. Her husband, Dr. Felton Norwood, was a pediatrician at Piedmont Hospital for more than 30 years.  She was born in Augusta, Georgia.

References

External links
 Campaign website
 City of Atlanta Online
 Mary Norwood on Facebook
 Mary Norwood on Twitter

1952 births
Atlanta City Council members
Living people
Georgia (U.S. state) Independents
Politicians from Augusta, Georgia
Women city councillors in Georgia (U.S. state)